The 1990 Hackney Council election took place on 3 May 1990 to elect members of Hackney London Borough Council in London, England. The whole council was up for election and the council went in no overall control.

Election results

References

1990
1990 London Borough council elections